Sredniye Karamaly (Urta Qaramalı) is a rural locality (a selo) and the administrative centre of Srednekarmalinsky Selsoviet, Yermekeyevsky District, Bashkortostan, Russia. The population was 403 as of 2010. There are 4 streets.

Geography 
Sredniye Karamaly is located 14 km southwest of Yermekeyevo. Nizhniye Karamaly is the nearest rural locality.

References 

Rural localities in Yermekeyevsky District